= Werner Korte (musicologist) =

German musicologist (1906–1982)

- Born: Werner Ferdinand Korte; 29 May 1906; Münster, North Rhine-Westphalia, Germany
- Died: 26 November 1982 (aged 76); Münster, North Rhine-Westphalia, Germany
- Occupation: Musicologist
- Years active: 1920s–1970s
- Employer: University of Münster
- Musical career
- Genres: Classical

Werner Ferdinand Korte (29 May 1906 – 26 November 1982) was a German musicologist who in 1932 was appointed head of the Seminar of Musicology at the University of Münster, the city where he was born and died. His books include Die Harmonik des frühen XV. Jahrhunderts in ihrem Zusammenhang mit der Formtechnik (1929), Studie zur Geschichte der Musik in Italien im ersten Viertel des 15. Jahrhunderts (1933), Robert Schumann (1937), and Bruckner und Brahms (1963), among others.
